Limmud is a British-Jewish educational charity which, in the UK, produces a large annual winter festival and several other regional events throughout the year on the theme of Jewish learning. Limmud is not affiliated to any strand of Judaism, stating "We have no part to play in the debates between/across denominations" in its mission statement. Limmud markets itself as open to "anyone interested in Jewish learning". The Limmud event in the UK has inspired a worldwide movement of Limmud groups, so the name 'Limmud' now refers both to the UK charity and the worldwide network (Limmud itself only operates in the UK). Its motto is "wherever you find yourself, Limmud will take you one step further on your Jewish journey."

Limmud (from the Hebrew word meaning "to learn") was originally a conference for "educators", basing itself on CAJE, the Conference on Alternatives in Jewish Education of North America. Taking CAJE's volunteer ethos, not paying presenters and not using people's titles, Limmud has grown to be a large international movement. During the 1990s there was the significant change as Limmud reinvented itself as a community gathering, giving rise to a significant increase in the number of attendees and leading it to be described as "British Jewry's greatest export". The Limmud model has now spread to many other countries.

A distinctive feature of Limmud is that the events are organised by volunteers, who also take part as equals in what is now called the Limmud Festival (held in the UK). Limmud Festival's largest group of volunteers are in their 20s and 30s. Around half of the UK "Forty under 40" (a community-wide initiative to identify the future leaders of British Jewry, published by Jewish News) have volunteered for Limmud and a former Chair of Limmud, Elliott Goldstein, topped the list.

History 
Limmud held its first conference in 1980 for 80 people organised by Alastair Falk, Michael May, Jonathan Benjamin and Clive Lawton, inspired by a visit to the Coalition for the Advancement of Jewish Education (CAJE) in North America. Its aim was to build bridges between professional and nonprofessional educators and between those of differing religious commitments. The next year participation had doubled and all aspects of Jewish learning were covered.

By 1996 the main Limmud conference had expanded and moved to Oxford with attendance of over 1,000, 250 sessions and 140 speakers, becoming the largest Jewish conference in Europe. During this period the organisation also held smaller one day events in Glasgow and Leeds.

In 1999 the first non-UK Limmud was held in Sydney, Australia.

2006 saw Limmud appoint its first full-time Executive Director, Raymond Simonson. Prior to this Limmud had been run by part-time directors.

The late 2000s saw Limmud participation in the UK grow dramatically. In 2007 Limmud held their conference at Warwick University, with 2,000 participants and 600 at Limmud Fest, a smaller summer festival. With numbers more than doubling in 2008 to 7,000 for their UK events. International conferences were now held in Cape Town, Johannesburg, Hungary, Atlanta, Buenos Aires, Bulgaria, Los Angeles, Philadelphia, Poland, Stockholm, Ukraine, Germany, Turkey, Toronto, New York and France.

Limmud Conference moved to Birmingham for Conference 2015, with a record 2,800 participants. New Limmud groups include Arizona, Mar del Plata, Australia, Tel Aviv, Chile and Essen.

In 2017 Limmud Conference became Limmud Festival. Limmud set up affiliates in North America and Israel. Limmud estimates there are 40,000 participants annually in a Limmud worldwide, run by 4,000 volunteers. In 2017 Limmud was also awarded the Jerusalem Unity Prize for contribution to Jewish life, presented by Israeli President Rivlin.

In 2018 and 2019, formal legal entities were set up to co-ordinate and support Limmud teams in North America and Israel. A structural review in 2020 recommended the creation of a new global entity to represent Limmud groups around the world.

Organisation
Limmud is a company and a charity. It is run by a board of directors and trustees, all of whom are volunteers. Initially, there was no difference between Limmud the organisation and Limmud Conference, the annual event, so the chairs of the Conference/Festival team were the chairs of the organisation. In 1990, a chair for the organisation who was separate from the Conference chairs was appointed for the first time. In 2006, Limmud International was created, as a separate unit within Limmud to manage relationships with other Limmud groups around the world. Limmud International was absorbed back into Limmud at the end of 2016. 

Chairs of Limmud Conference/Festival

Chairs of Limmud
 1990–1997 Andrew Gilbert
 1998–2001 Judy Trotter
 1998–2000 Natan Tiefenbrun
 2001–2003 Claire Straus
 2003–2005 Claire Mandel
 2006–2009 Elliott Goldstein
 2010–2012 Carolyn Bogush
 2013–2015 Kevin Sefton
 2016–2019 David Hoffman
 2019–2020  Shoshana Bloom
 2020 – Carolyn Bogush, Elliott Goldstein

Chairs of Limmud International
 2006–2009 Andrew Gilbert
 2010–2012 Uri Berkowitz, Helena Miller
 2013–2014 David Hoffman
 2015–2016 David Bilchitz

Chairs of Limmud Global Board
 2020 – Shoshana Bloom

Chairs of Limmud UK Executive
 2021 – Ysabella Hawkings, Abigail Jacobi

Staff
Limmud's first professional appointment in 1998 was of Clive Lawton as part-time Executive Director; he gradually became backed by a full-time administrator. In 2006 Limmud recruited its first full-time Executive Director, Raymond Simonson, former Director of UJIA Makor: The Centre for Informal Jewish Education. When Simonson became Chief Executive of London's Jewish Community Centre, now JW3, in 2012 he was succeeded by Shelley Marsh. She stepped down from the role in 2015. Mike Schindler was the Limmud Director of Operations and the senior professional in the organisation between March and August 2015, and then Dani Serlin was Acting Executive Director until February 2016. In February 2016, Limmud appointed Chief Executive, Eli Ovits, as senior professional. Ovits left in 2020.

Limmud events in the UK

Limmud Festival
Limmud Festival (until 2017 known as Limmud Conference), takes place every year in the last week of December and is the organisation's flagship event.  It was inspired by the CAJE conference in the United States  and now attracts more than 2,000 participants annually; in 2015 the numbers rose to 2,750. A typical day at Limmud Festival includes around 200 sessions spanning religious, cultural and political aspects of Jewish life.  After the first conferences at Carmel College (Oxfordshire), Limmud Conference has been held at Portsmouth Polytechnic (1984), Oxford Brookes University (1986–1994), Worcester (1995–96), Manchester (1997), the University of Nottingham (1998–2006) and Warwick University (2007–14). From 2015 to 2019 this annual event was held at the hotels surrounding Pendigo Lake, near Birmingham. The 2020 and 2021 festivals, held during the COVID-19 pandemic, were online events.

Limmud summer events
Limmud held a summer event in the last week of August which was called Limmud Fest from 2004 to 2012 and Limmud in the Woods from 2013 to 2016. It involved camping as well as staying indoors, had a less intense programme centred on Shabbat and was more cultural and outdoors-focused than its winter sibling. Limmud Fest had a peak attendance of 650 people; Limmud in the Woods was attended by around 200–250 young adults and young families.

Day and weekend Limmud events
The first Day Limmud was in Sheffield in the early 1980s, followed by Leeds in the mid-1990s. Day and weekend Limmuds are now held at a number of venues in the UK, including Birmingham, Cambridge, Harrow, Hull, Leeds, Liverpool, Manchester, and the Thames Valley.

Limmud events have also been held in Bournemouth, Brighton, Glasgow, Hackney, London, Newcastle upon Tyne, South London and South East London.

Other Limmud events in UK
Other events run by Limmud in the UK, either on their own or in partnership with others, have included music events and the Florence Melton Adult Mini-School, organised in partnership with the London Jewish Cultural Centre.

Limmuds around the world

The Limmud model has now spread to many other countries. More than ninety communities in 42 countries on six continents have hosted Limmud events including Hong Kong,. Peru, India, Montenegro, Majorca and Jamaica.

Limmud events around the world have included: 

UK
Limmud Bristol SW, Limmud Cambridge, Limmud Festival, Limmud Harrow, Limmud Hull, Limmud Leeds, Limmud Liverpool, Limmud Manchester, Limmud Midlands, Limmud Scotland, Limmud Thames Valley

Africa, Asia and Australasia

Australia: Limmud Canberra, Limmud Oz Melbourne, Limmud Oz Perth, Limmud Oz Sydney
Limmud New Zealand 
Limmud China: Limmud Beijing, Limmud Shanghai 
Limmud India 
Limmud Réunion 

South Africa

Limmud SA: Limmud Cape Cape Town, Limmud Durban, Limmud Johannesburg

North America

USA: Limmud AZ, Limmud Bay Area, Limmud Boca, Limmud Boston, Limmud Chicago + MW, Limmud LA, Limmud Miami, Limmud Michigan, Limmud NOLA, Limmud NY, Limmud Philly, Limmud Seattle, 
Canada: Limmud Kingston, Limmud Ottawa, Limmud Toronto, Limmud Vancouver, Limmud Winnipeg

Latin America

Argentina: Limmud Buenos Aires, Limmud Mar Del Plata
Limmud Bogota
Limmud Caracas
Limmud Chile
Limmud Costa Rica
Limmud Mexico

Europe

Limmud Baltics (covers Estonia, Latvia and Lithuania)
Limmud Czech Republic- Slovak Republic
Limmud ExYu (covers Macedonia, Montenegro and Serbia)
Limmud France- Limmud Paris, Limmud Marseille
Limmud Germany- Limmud Berlin, Limmud Cologne, Limmud Essen, Limmud Frankfurt A.M, Limmud Freiburg, Limmud Hamburg, Limmud Munich
Limmud Helsinki
Limmud Hungary
Limmud Italia -Limmud Italia in Jerusalem
Limmud Keshet Bulgaria
Limmud Latvia
Limmud Lithuania
Limmud Netherlands
Limmud Oresund (covers Copenhagen, Lund and Malmo)
Limmud Poland- Limmud Wrocław
Spain: Limmud Barcelona, Limmud Madrid, Limmud Mallorca
Limmud Stockholm
Limmud Turkey
Limmud Vienna

Israel

Limmud Arava
Limmud Galil
Limmud Golan
Limmud Haifa
Limmud Jerusalem
Limmud Modi'in
Limmud Tel Aviv
Limmud Yeroham

FSU

Limmud FSU Belarus
Limmud FSU Canada
Limmud FSU Europe
Limmud FSU Israel
Limmud FSU Moldova
Limmud FSU Moscow
Limmud FSU NY
Limmud FSU St Petersburg
Limmud FSU Ukraine
Limmud FSU Volga-Urals
Limmud FSU West Coast

Events based upon the Limmud concept

Russia: Lsaran
Switzerland: Jom Ijun
United Kingdom: British Islam Conference
United States: Tidewater Yom Limmud, Jewish Community Day of Learning Naples
Other international Limmud entities:

Chair of Limmud North America

2017–2019 Shep Rosenman

2019–2021 Faye Rosenberg-Cohen, Sivie Twersky

2021–   Tony Abrams

Chair of Limmud Israel

2018–2020 Danielle Nagler

2021–   Eli Ovits

Chair of Limmud FSU (Former Soviet Union)

2006–    Chaim Chesler, Sandy Kahn

Relationships with Orthodoxy in Britain
The former London United Synagogue Beth Din's Head Dayan (rabbinic judge), Chanoch Ehrentreu, advised Orthodox rabbis not to attend Limmud Conference. However, in the UK many United Synagogue pulpit rabbis have attended Limmud. In December 2010 Rabbi Yitzchak Schochet of Mill Hill United Synagogue, who had been seen as a notable absentee and critic of Limmud, attended, took part in and taught at Limmud's 30th annual Conference. Following this he wrote on the synagogue's website: "upon return all I could ask myself was, 'where was I until now?'"

Jonathan Sacks did not attend Limmud whilst being Chief Rabbi but attended when he was the head of Jews College. Sacks, when looking back on his rabbinate, considers Limmud to be one of the great successes of his time.

Controversy erupted again in 2013 when newly elected Chief Rabbi Ephraim Mirvis announced his decision to attend. Subsequently, a public notice signed by seven leading Orthodox rabbis including Dayan Chanoch Ehrentreu and Rabbi Avrohom Gurwicz was published in the Jewish Tribune, highly critical of pluralism and urged "God-fearing Jews" not to participate in Limmud. This sparked condemnation by non-Charedi communal leaders, with Jewish Leadership Council chairman Mick Davis, Board of Deputies president Vivian Wineman and United Synagogue president Stephen Pack writing to The Jewish Chronicle, describing the statement as showing "a shocking failure of leadership". The Jewish Chronicle itself described the statement as "crass, ill-judged and ultimately self-defeating". Mirvis's attendance at the 2013 Limmud Conference was well received by fellow participants. At least nine other United Synagogue rabbis also attended the event.

See also
Clive Lawton
Limmud FSU
Limmud International
Limmud South Africa

Notes and references

External links
 Limmud (UK parent organisation)

1980 establishments in the United Kingdom
Educational charities based in the United Kingdom
Educational organizations established in 1980
Jewish British culture
Jewish charities based in the United Kingdom
Jewish educational organizations